Kim Hong-woo (Hangul: 김홍우; born November 11, 1985), better known by his stage name Reddy (Hangul: 레디), is a South Korean rapper and singer. He released his debut single, Capt. Reddy, on September 27, 2011. He has also appeared on Show Me the Money 5, Tribe of Hip Hop and High School Style Icon.

Discography

Studio albums

Extended plays

Singles

Notes

References

External links 

 

1985 births
Living people
South Korean male rappers
South Korean hip hop singers
21st-century South Korean  male singers